The Ministry of Agriculture (MOA) was an executive state agency within the government of the People's Republic of China. Its responsibilities were assumed by the Ministry of Agriculture and Rural Affairs on March 19, 2018. Areas of responsibility included agriculture and environmental issues relating to agriculture, fishery, consumer affairs, animal husbandry, horticulture, animal welfare, foodstuffs, hunting and game management as well as higher education and research in the field of agricultural sciences.

The ministry is headquartered in Beijing.

List of Agriculture Ministers

See also
Agriculture in the People's Republic of China
Standardization Administration of China SAC
Ministries of China
Council of Agriculture of the Republic of China
Ministry of Agriculture and Rural Affairs

References

External links 
 Ministry of Agriculture official website 
 China Agriculture Information Website (webhost of Ministry Of Agriculture) 

Agriculture
China
Agricultural organizations based in China
China, Agriculture
China, Agriculture
1949 disestablishments in China
2018 disestablishments in China